Julie Mary Stockton (born 19 April 1959) is an Australian former cricketer who played as a wicket-keeper and right-handed batter. She appeared in three Test matches and three One Day Internationals for Australia between 1976 and 1979. She scored a century on her Test match debut, with 117 against New Zealand. She played domestic cricket for New South Wales.

Stockton was the captain of New South Wales during the 1978/79 season. At the time of her appointment, she was the youngest person to lead a New South Wales cricket team.

References

External links

 Julie Stockton at southernstars.org.au

Living people
1959 births
Cricketers from Sydney
Australia women Test cricketers
Australia women One Day International cricketers
New South Wales Breakers cricketers
Women cricketers who made a century on Test debut
Wicket-keepers